Nurin (also Romanized as Nūrīn; also known as Narūn and Nurun) is a village in Howmeh Rural District, in the Central District of Abhar County, Zanjan Province, Iran. At the 2006 census, its population was 2,088, in 550 families.

References 

Populated places in Abhar County